Hoeffel is a surname. Notable people with the surname include:

Joseph Hoeffel (1890–1964), American football player
Joe Hoeffel (born 1950), American author and politician
Mike Hoeffel (born 1989), American ice hockey player